"Madras Central" is an English poem and the best known work of Vijay Nambisan, the Indian poet, writer and journalist. The poem won First Prize in the inaugural All India Poetry Competition conducted by The Poetry Society (India) in 1988. The poem has received critical acclaim following its first publication in 1989.

Comments and criticism
The poem has received positive reviews since the day of its publication. The poem has been quoted in scholarly analysis of contemporary Indian English Poetry. The last three lines of the poem have come to be regarded as representative voice of contemporary Indian poetry.

See also
Indian English poetry
The Poetry Society (India)

Notes

External links
  First National Poetry Competition 1988 – Award Winners
  India Writes – Contemporary Indian Poetry
"Best Indian English Poems"

1988 poems
Indian English poems
Works originally published in Indian magazines
Works originally published in literary magazines